Legs of Gold (Italian: Gambe d'oro) is a 1958 Italian sports film directed by Turi Vasile and Antonio Margheriti and starring Totò, Memmo Carotenuto and Rossella Como.

Plot 
Barone Luigi Fontana is a rich and stingy producer of fine wines, as well as president of the amateur football team of Cerignola who, to crown a triumphant championship, is about to be promoted. The environment is idyllic with all the players linked together as brothers.

The balance is upset by the arrival of a Milan attorney who declares ready to buy two players, immediately creating the jealousy of others.

Cast
 Totò as barone Luigi Fontana  
 Memmo Carotenuto as Armando  
 Rossella Como as Carla Fontana  
 Scilla Gabel as Gianna  
 Paolo Ferrari as Aldo Maggi  
 Rosario Borelli as Franco Savelli  
 Dolores Palumbo as Emma, moglie di Armando  
 Elsa Merlini as Luisa Fontana  
 Giampiero Littera as Riccardo  
 Turi Pandolfini as Sindaco 
 Luigi Pavese as commendatore Renzoni  
 Enzo Furlai
 José Jaspe as  di Renzoli  
 Nino Vingelli as Carmine  
 Bruno Carotenuto  
 Walter Santesso as Teodoro  
 Cristina De Angelis 
 Maria Vitale 
 Gabriele Ladogana as Peppiniello  
 Attilio Martella
 Jimmy il Fenomeno as Cerignola supporter

References

Bibliography
 Ennio Bìspuri. Totò: principe clown : tutti i film di Totò. Guida Editori, 1997.

External links

1958 films
1950s sports films
1950s Italian-language films
Films directed by Antonio Margheriti
Italian association football films
Titanus films
1950s Italian films